K. Suppu (died 29 October 2011) was an Indian politician and former Member of the Legislative Assembly of Tamil Nadu. He was elected to the Tamil Nadu legislative assembly as a Communist Party of India candidate from Rajapalayam constituency in 1971 election. He later joined and became a well-known maverick in the Dravida Munnetra Kazhagam party.

References 

Tamil Nadu politicians
Members of the Tamil Nadu Legislative Assembly
Dravida Munnetra Kazhagam politicians
2011 deaths
1941 births